The Grotta del Castiglione is a lofty cave on the island of Capri, Italy. It is located high up in the hill of the same name, facing south. When the inhabitants of Capri took refuge in it at the time of the Turkish raids, there was a way to it from the east, but the path has since been destroyed by the crumbling of the cliff.

References

Caves of Campania
Capri, Campania